= IndyCar (disambiguation) =

INDYCAR (all caps), is the sanctioning body.

IndyCar or Indy car may also refer to:

- Indy car, a type of open wheel race car primarily associated with the Indianapolis 500 and the championship circuit
- IndyCar Series, the top open wheel racing series sanctioned by IndyCar
- Champ Car, formerly known as the IndyCar World Series, an open wheel racing series from 1980 to 1997 and 2003–7
